Robert Vaughan is an American writer. He has authored over 200 books. He won the 1977 Porgie Award (Best Paperback Original) for The Power and the Pride. He has also written a series of contemporary and historical romance novels under several pseudonyms including "Paula Moore" and "Paula Fairman".  He wrote the novelization for the television movie Andersonville.

Vaughan is a frequent speaker at seminars and at high schools and colleges, and has also hosted three television talk shows: Eyewitness Magazine on WAVY-TV in Portsmouth, Virginia; Tidewater A.M. on W05BQ-TV in Hampton, Virginia; and This Week in Books on the TEMPO Cable Television Network. He has also written and produced a one-man play about Ernest Hemingway.

Vaughan is a retired Army Warrant Officer (CW-3) with three tours in Vietnam where he was awarded the Distinguished Flying Cross, the Air Medal with the V for valor, the Bronze Star, the Meritorious Service Medal, and the Purple Heart. He was a helicopter pilot and a maintenance and supply officer. He was also an instructor and Chief of the Aviation Maintenance Officers' Course at Fort Eustis, Virginia.

Vaughan was inducted into the Writers' Hall of Fame in 1998.

References

Year of birth missing (living people)
1930s births
Living people
United States Army soldiers
United States Army personnel of the Vietnam War
Novelists from Missouri
People from Sikeston, Missouri
Place of birth missing (living people)
United States Army aviators
Recipients of the Air Medal
Recipients of the Distinguished Flying Cross (United States)
American male novelists
20th-century American novelists
20th-century American male writers